Flora Frangepán (fl. 1743), was a Hungarian writer.

She was a member of the order of Saint Clare in Bratislava. Between 1722 and 1743, she made several translations which were also published.

References

 Danielik József: Magyar írók. Életrajz-gyűjtemény. Második, az elsőt kiegészítő kötet. Pest, Szent István Társulat, 1858.

18th-century Hungarian women writers
18th-century Hungarian writers
Hungarian Roman Catholic religious sisters and nuns
18th-century Roman Catholic nuns